Syria is scheduled to participate at the 2018 Summer Youth Olympics in Buenos Aires, Argentina from 6 October to 18 October 2018.

Athletics

Syria qualified one athlete.

 Women's 1500m - 1 athlete

Equestrian

Syria qualified a rider based on its ranking in the FEI World Jumping Challenge Rankings.

 Individual Jumping - 1 athlete

Triathlon

Syria qualified one athlete based on its performance at the 2018 Asian Youth Olympic Games Qualifier.

Individual

Relay

References

2018 in Syrian sport
Nations at the 2018 Summer Youth Olympics
Syria at the Youth Olympics